The 2020 F4 Spanish Championship was the fifth season of the Spanish F4 Championship. It was a multi-event motor racing championship for open wheel, formula racing cars regulated according to FIA Formula 4 regulations, taking place in Spain. The championship featured drivers competing in 1.4 litre Tatuus-Abarth single seat race cars that conformed to the technical regulations for the championship. The series was organised by RFEDA.

Entry list

Race calendar
The series posted the original schedule on 4 December 2019. After the start of the season was delayed due to the 2019-20 coronavirus pandemic, the series released a new calendar on 1 June 2020.

Championship

Points were awarded to the top ten classified finishers in races 1 and 3 and for the top eight classified finishers in race 2. For Round 2 at Paul Ricard only Race 1 awarded full points.

Drivers' championship
Rookie Trophy  
Female Trophy F

Notes:
† — Drivers did not finish the race, but were classified as they completed over 75% of the race distance.

Teams' championship

References

External links
 

Spanish
Spanish F4 Championship seasons
Spanish F4